Colmesneil Independent School District is a public school district based in Colmesneil, Texas (USA).  Located in Tyler County, the district extends into a small portion of southern Jasper County and western Jasper counties. Colmesneil ISD also owns and operates Lake Tejas, which is open in the summer from Memorial Day to Labor Day.

Schools
Colmesneil ISD has two campuses:
 Colmesneil Junior High & High School (Grades 7-12),
 Colmesneil Elementary School (Grades PK-6)

The Colmesneil Independent School District (CISD) received a letter grade of "B".

2020-2021 Colmesneil ISD District and Campus State and Accountability Ratings:
Colmesneil ISD - Letter Grade of "B".
Colmesneil JH/HS - Letter Grade of "B".
Colmesneil Elementary - Letter Grade of "Not Rated".

In 2009, the school district was rated "recognized" by the Texas Education Agency.

References

External links
 
 Lake Tejas

School districts in Tyler County, Texas
School districts in Angelina County, Texas
School districts in Jasper County, Texas